Mayers is a surname. Notable people with the surname include:

Alan Mayers (born 1937), British footballer
Antonio Mayers (born 1979), Barbadian cricketer 
Emanuel Mayers (born 1989), Trinidadian hurdler
George Mayers (1860–1952), Irish Anglican priest
Jamal Mayers (born 1974), Canadian ice hockey player
John Mayers (1801–1865), British cricketer
Kyle Mayers (born 1992), Barbadian cricketer
Mike Mayers (born 1991), American baseball player
Naomi Mayers, Australian indigenous rights activist and singer
Natasha Mayers (born 1979), Saint Vincent and the Grenadines sprinter
 Rakim Mayers, known as ASAP Rocky (born 1988), American rapper, music producer and record executive
Raymond Mayers (born 1960), Australian water polo player
Sharne Mayers (born 1992), Zimbabwean cricketer
Vincent Mayers (1934–2013), Guyanese cricketer